Florence Hale (14 May 1887 – 2 April 1945), was an American actress.

She was born in Iowa, United States and died in San Diego, California.

Selected filmography
 The Black Sheep of the Family (1916)

External links

References

1887 births
1945 deaths
American film actresses
American silent film actresses
20th-century American actresses